Pepsi Spire is a touch screen soda fountain introduced by PepsiCo. The Spire's main competitor is the Coca-Cola Freestyle. Currently, Spire is available to retailers in two models, 2.0 and 5.0. It was designed by the Japanese machinery company Mitsubishi Heavy Industries.

Choices
The Spire has up to eight flavor options, depending on retailer selection: Cherry, Vanilla, Strawberry, Lemon, Raspberry, Lime, Grape and Peach.

Pepsi also markets their major brands for the machine, including:
 Pepsi
 Diet Pepsi
 Pepsi Zero Sugar (Pepsi Max outside the United States and Canada)
 Sierra Mist/Starry (7 Up outside the United States)
 Crush (Tango outside of the United States and Canada)
 Gatorade G2 Fruit Punch
 Dole Kiwi Cocktail
 Tropicana Juices & Lemonade (Brisk Lemonade outside United States)
 Mountain Dew
 Diet Mountain Dew
 Dr. Pepper
 Diet Dr. Pepper
 Mug Root Beer
 Diet Mug Root Beer
 Schweppes
 Brisk Iced Tea brands
 Manzanita Sol
 SoBe Lifewater
Crush, Gatorade, Dole Kiwi Cocktail, all Dr Pepper brands, and Schweppes are not available at Pepsi Spire soda fountains in the United States.

Locations
Countries that have Pepsi Spire soda fountains include the United States, Canada, Switzerland, and Iran. There are 3148 locations in the United States, 430 in Canada, 1 in Switzerland, and 1 in Iran. 
It is served in many Subway locations in various countries (in the United States, most that are under contract with Coca-Cola do not use this). It is also at Shippensburg University of Pennsylvania, Muhlenberg College, University of Wisconsin–Oshkosh, Northern Arizona University, DePaul University, New Jersey Institute of Technology, and Hersheypark.

See also
 Coca-Cola Freestyle

External links
 

Commercial machines
PepsiCo
Soft drinks
Vending machines
2010s in food